Sorting Out Rachel is an Australian comedy play by David Williamson. It premiered in 2018 directed by Nadia Tass. Tass said the play is “ a debate about our responsibility to indigenous communities. And it’s set against a family backdrop where the characters are complex and where each of the characters fear losing their entitlement.”

Plot
A wealthy man has to break the news to his family that he has a secret daughter.

References

External links
Sorting Out Rachel at Ausstage
Review of Sydney production at Sydney Morning Herald
Review of 2018 Sydney production at Kevin Jackson
Review of 2018 Sydney production at Daily Telegraph

Plays by David Williamson
2018 plays
Comedy plays